Bunkerville is a census-designated place in Clark County, Nevada, United States. The population was 1,303 at the 2010 census.

Geography

Climate
Bunkerville has a hot desert climate (Köppen: BWh), with cool winters and very hot summers.

History
Bunkerville was settled in 1877 by Mormon pioneers from Utah. It is named after Edward Bunker, who was already a seasoned pioneer settler before he came to Bunkerville, having pioneered the settlement at Santa Clara, Utah.

The residents of Bunkerville, so named by Brigham Young, established a new communal effort, sharing the work and the fruits of their work, with all land being held in common. The communal experiment ended in 1880.

According to the Federal Writers' Project, Bunkerville had 287 inhabitants in 1941.

In the 1950s, Bunkerville was downwind of nuclear test sites, which caused a spike in childhood leukemia and other cancers in the region. Residents recall playing in nuclear fallout as if it were snow, and report a lasting mistrust of the government.

In the spring of 2014, Bunkerville was the scene of the Bundy standoff, an armed confrontation between protesters and law enforcement over the non-payment of the grazing fees by Cliven Bundy, a local rancher.

Demographics

As of the census of 2000, there were 1,014 people, 258 households, and 222 families residing in the CDP. The population density was 23.6 people per square mile (9.1/km2). There were 277 housing units at an average density of 6.4 per square mile (2.5/km2). The racial makeup of the CDP was 75.15% White, 0.69% African American, 1.87% Asian, 0.59% Pacific Islander, 15.68% from other races, and 6.02% from two or more races. Hispanic or Latino of any race were 24.85% of the population.

There were 258 households, out of which 54.7% had children under the age of 18 living with them, 72.9% were married couples living together, 10.5% had a female householder with no husband present, and 13.6% were non-families. 11.6% of all households were made up of individuals, and 5.8% had someone living alone who was 65 years of age or older. The average household size was 3.93 and the average family size was 4.27.

In the CDP, the population was spread out, with 41.9% under the age of 18, 9.5% from 18 to 24, 26.5% from 25 to 44, 15.8% from 45 to 64, and 6.3% who were 65 years of age or older. The median age was 24 years. For every 100 females, there were 99.2 males. For every 100 females age 18 and over, there were 99.7 males.

The median income for a household in the CDP was $45,076, and the median income for a family was $46,098. Males had a median income of $27,153 versus $20,878 for females. The per capita income for the CDP was $16,820. About 3.6% of families and 7.9% of the population were below the poverty line, including 13.4% of those under age 18 and 8.9% of those age 65 or over.

Education
Bunkerville has a public library, a branch of the Las Vegas-Clark County Library District.

Notable people
 Juanita Brooks (1898–1989), born in Bunkerville; Mormon writer, editor, historian, descendant of Bunkerville pioneer Dudley Leavitt
 Ammon Bundy (born 1975), son of Cliven Bundy and leader of the 2016 occupation of the Malheur National Wildlife Refuge
 Cliven Bundy (born 1946), cattle rancher involved in the Bundy standoff
 Edward Bunker (August 1, 1822 – November 17, 1901), Mormon pioneer for whom Bunkerville is named
 Dixie L. Leavitt (born 1929), Utah state legislator and businessman, lived in Bunkerville

See also

 List of census-designated places in Nevada

References

External links

 Bunkerville Town Advisory Board 
 Clark County Justice Court, Bunkerville

Bundy standoff
Census-designated places in Clark County, Nevada
Census-designated places in Nevada
Populated places established in 1877
Populated places in the Mojave Desert
Unincorporated towns in Nevada
1877 establishments in Nevada